The Vaqueros Formation is a sedimentary geologic unit primarily of Upper Oligocene and Lower Miocene age, which is widespread on the California coast and coastal ranges in approximately the southern half of the state.  It is predominantly a medium-grained sandstone unit, deposited in a shallow marine environment.  Because of its high porosity and nearness to petroleum source rocks, in many places it is an oil-bearing unit, wherever it has been configured into structural or stratigraphic traps by folding and faulting.  Being resistant to erosion, it forms dramatic outcrops in the coastal mountains.  Its color ranges from grayish-green to light gray when freshly broken, and it weathers to a light brown or buff color.

Type locality and deposition environment

The type locality of the Vaqueros is from Vaqueros Canyon in the Santa Lucia Mountains, about eight miles southwest of Greenfield.  The formation was first described by Homer Hamlin in 1904, as part of a report on the water resources of the Salinas Valley.

The sandstone unit consists of well-sorted grains, averaging medium-size, typically quartz and feldspar with some black flecks, and in form it ranges from cross-bedded to massive and thick-bedded.  Occasionally it contains pebbles, especially near its base where it sits on the red non-marine Sespe Formation.  Some fossils – including mollusks and barnacles – can be found in the Vaqueros, also near the base of the unit where the depositional environment was nearest shore.

The unit was deposited by runoff from highlands to the east into a shallow, warm marine environment, as the ocean transgressed on the subsiding floodplain containing the Sespe in the late Oligocene age, between 26 and 28 Ma (million years before present) to 24 to 25 Ma.  As the land continued to subside, the ocean depth increased with a corresponding drop in grain size in higher strata.  The topmost part of the Vaqueros contains interbedded mudstones, silstones, and fine-grained sandstones, representing this shift.  The unit above the Vaqueros, the Rincon Formation, consists of deepwater shales.

The Vaqueros weathers to a clayey soil which supports chaparral, and on the southern slopes of the Santa Ynez Mountains in southern Santa Barbara County, its contact with the Rincon Formation is easily visible for it correlates closely to the line where the grassland or coastal sage scrub, nearer the coast, abruptly changes to dense chaparral on the mountainside.

Paleontology
Fossils found in the Vaqueros are mostly near-shore marine organisms, such as mollusks, scallops, and oysters (Turritella sp., Pecten sp., Ostrea sp.)  While the molluscan stage is hard to date and ranges from the Miocene epoch, strata from Simi Valley have sampled in the upper Oligocene period.

Mammals

As a petroleum-bearing unit
In some places, the Vaqueros has been deformed into anticlinal structures, or pinched out into structural traps, allowing petroleum to become trapped in economically recoverable quantities.  Some locations where this has occurred include the Ellwood and Mesa Oil Fields in Santa Barbara County, and the Kettleman North Dome and Coalinga Oil Fields in the Central Valley.  When grouped with the underlying Sespe Formation, because of its high porosity and the presence of an impermeable cap in the overlying Rincon Formation, it is the second-most important producing horizon in Southern California.

Notes

References

 C. Michael Hogan, Leda Patmore, David Crimp et al., San Lorenzo Basin Groundwater Recharge and Water Quality Study, Earth Metrics Incorporated, Association of Monterey Bay Area Governments, July 7, 1978
 United States Geological Survey. 1921. Bulletin, Volume 721, US Government Printing Office, Washington DC

Geologic formations of California
Miocene California
Paleogene California
Geology of Fresno County, California
Geology of Monterey County, California
Geology of San Luis Obispo County, California
Geology of Santa Barbara County, California
Geology of Ventura County, California
Geography of the San Joaquin Valley
Santa Lucia Range
Santa Ynez Mountains
Transverse Ranges